This is an incomplete list of assemblers: computer programs that translate assembly language source code into binary programs. Some assemblers are components of a compiler system for a high level language and may have limited or no usable functionality outside of the compiler system.  Some assemblers are hosted on the target processor and operating system, while other assemblers (cross-assemblers) may run under  an unrelated operating system or processor.  For example, assemblers for embedded systems are not usually hosted on the target system since it would not have the storage and terminal I/O to permit entry of a program from a keyboard. An assembler may have a single target processor or may have options to support multiple processor types. Very simple assemblers may lack features, such as macros, present in more powerful versions.

As part of a compiler suite 

GNU Assembler (GAS): GPL: many target instruction sets, including ARM architecture, Atmel AVR, x86, x86-64, Freescale 68HC11, Freescale v4e, Motorola 680x0, MIPS, PowerPC, IBM System z, TI MSP430, Zilog Z80.
SDAS (fork of ASxxxx Cross Assemblers and part of the Small Device C Compiler project): GPL: several target instruction sets including Intel 8051, Zilog Z80, Freescale 68HC08, PIC microcontroller.
The Amsterdam Compiler Kit (ACK) targets many architectures of the 1980s, including 6502, 6800, 680x0, ARM, x86, Zilog Z80 and Z8000.
LLVM targets many platforms, however its main focus is not machine-dependent code generation; instead a more high-level typed assembly-like intermediate representation is used. Nevertheless for the most common targets the LLVM MC (machine code) project provides an assembler both as an integrated component of the compilers and as an external tool.
 Some other self-hosted native-targeted language implementations (like Go, Free Pascal, SBCL) have their own assemblers with multiple targets. They may be used for inline assembly inside the language, or even included as a library, but aren't always suitable for being used outside of their framework - no command-line tool exists, or only the intermediate representation can be used as their input, or the set of supported targets is very limited.

Single target assemblers

6502 assemblers

680x0 assemblers

ARM assemblers

Mainframe Assemblers

POWER, PowerPC, and Power ISA assemblers

x86 assemblers

  Part of the MINIX 3 source tree, but without obvious development activity.
  Developed by Interactive Systems Corporation in 1986 when they ported UNIX System V to Intel iAPX286 and 80386 architectures. Archetypical of ATT syntax because it was used as reference for GAS. Still used for The SCO Group's products, UnixWare and OpenServer.
  Home site appears inactive. Also offered as part of FreeBSD Ports, in bcc-1995.03.12.
  Active, supported, but unadvertised.
  Developed in 1982 at MIT as a cross-assembler, it was picked up by Interactive Systems Corporation in 1983 when they developed PC/IX under IBM contract. The syntax was later used as base for ACK assembler, to be used in MINIX 1.x toolchain.
  RosAsm project on WebArchive.org.
  Part of the C++Builder Tool Chain, but not sold as a stand-alone product, or marketed since the CodeGear spin-off; Borland was still selling it until then. Version 5.0, the last, is dated 1996.
  Turbo Assembler was developed as Turbo Editasm by Uriah Barnett from Speedware Inc (Sacramento, CA) between 1984 and 1987, then later sold to, or marketed by, Borland as their Turbo Assembler.
  Last stable version 1.3.0 was released in August 2014, and low maintenance since then: https://github.com/yasm/yasm

x86-64 assemblers

Z80 assemblers

Other single target assemblers

Other

Notes and references

External links
 List of assemblers running on S100 bus hardware, including CP/M hosted assemblers for 8080 and Z80

Assembler
Assemblers